Yuhong District is one of ten districts of the prefecture-level city of Shenyang, the capital of Liaoning Province, Northeast China, and forms part of the northwestern and western suburbs. It borders Shenbei New Area to the northeast, Huanggu District to the east, Sujiatun District to the south, and Xinmin City to the west; in addition, Tiexi District also lies in between the two parts of Yuhong.

Economy
China Resources Beverage, the distributor of C'estbon water, has its northeast regional office in the district.

Administrative divisions
Subdistricts:
Yingbin Road Subdistrict, Shenliao Road Subdistrict, Lingxi Subdistrict, Beita Subdistrict, Yuhong Subdistrict, Yangshi Subdistrict, Beiling Subdistrict, Lingdong Subdistrict, Shaling Subdistrict

Towns:
Masanjia, Pingluo, Dapan, Zhaijia, Zaohua, Zhangyizhan, Gaohua

Townships:
Lingdong Township, Guanghui Township, Daqing Sino-Korean Friendship Township, Daxing Korean Ethnic Township

References

External links

County-level divisions of Liaoning
Shenyang